Empress Liu may refer to:

Liu E (Han Zhao) (died 314), third empress consort of Liu Cong, emperor of Han Zhao
Empress Liu ( 315), a later empress consort of Liu Cong, see Liu Cong's later empresses
Empress Liu (Liu Yao's second empress) (died 326), Liu Yao's second empress during the Former Zhao dynasty
Empress Liu (Liu Yao's third empress) ( 326), personal name Liu Fang, Liu Yao's third empress and a cousin of Liu Yao's second empress
Empress Liu (Shi Le's wife) (died 333), Shi Le's consort during the Later Zhao dynasty
Empress Liu (Shi Hu's wife) (318–349), Shi Hu's consort during the Later Zhao dynasty
Empress Liu (Huan Xuan's wife) ( 404), wife of Huan Xuan (ruler of Chu)
Empress Liu (Chen dynasty) (534–616), personal name Liu Jingyan, empress of the Chen dynasty
Empress Dowager Liu (Sui dynasty) ( 605–618), empress dowager of the Sui dynasty
Empress Liu (Tang dynasty) (died 693), empress of the Tang dynasty
Empress Liu (Li Maozhen's wife) (877–943), wife of Li Maozhen (ruler of Qi)
Empress Liu (Li Cunxu's wife) (died 926), Li Cunxu's consort during the Later Tang dynasty
Empress Liu (Li Congke's wife) (died 937), Li Congke's consort during the Later Tang dynasty
Empress Dowager Liu (Later Jin) (died 942), empress dowager of the Later Jin dynasty
Empress Liu (Zhenzong) (969–1033), Emperor Zhenzong of Song's consort and empress dowager during Emperor Renzong of Song's reign
Empress Liu (Zhezong) (1079–1113), Emperor Zhezong of Song's consort and empress dowager during Emperor Huizong of Song's reign

Liu